Zagajewski (feminine Zagajewska) is a Polish surname. Notable people with the surname include:

 Adam Zagajewski (1945–2021), Polish poet, novelist, translator, and essayist
 Stanisław Zagajewski (1927–2007), Polish sculptor
 Tadeusz Zagajewski (1912–2010), Polish electronic engineer

Polish-language surnames